Horesidotes is a genus of slant-faced grasshoppers in the family Acrididae. There are at least two described species in Horesidotes.

Species
These two species belong to the genus Horesidotes:
 Horesidotes cinereus Scudder, 1899 (ash-gray range grasshopper)
 Horesidotes deiradonotus (Jago, 1971)

References

Further reading

 
 
 

Acrididae genera
Articles created by Qbugbot
Gomphocerinae